Twin Triplets is a 1935 American comedy short released by Metro-Goldwyn-Mayer, produced by Hal Roach and directed by James Parrott, and starring Thelma Todd and Patsy Kelly. It is the 18th entry in the series.

Cast
Thelma Todd as Thelma
Patsy Kelly as Patsy
Greta Meyer as Mrs. Borgerschmith
John Dilson as Benton, City Editor
Billy Bletcher as Merchant
Bess Flowers as Nurse
Charlie Hall as Ambulance Attendant

References

External links